Sutter Island (formerly Schoolcraft Island) is a small island of the Sacramento River in California. It is bordered by the Sacramento River on the northeast, Steamboat Slough to the southease, and Sutter Slough to the west. It is located across the Sacramento River from Paintersville. It is part of Sacramento County, and managed by Reclamation District 349. It is shown, labeled "Schoolcraft Island", on an 1850 survey map of the San Francisco Bay area made by Cadwalader Ringgold and an 1854 map of the area by Henry Lange.

References

Islands of Sacramento County, California
Islands of the Sacramento–San Joaquin River Delta
Islands of Northern California